Ambrosius Moibanus (4 April 1494 – 16 January 1554) was a German Lutheran theologian and reformer, and first Lutheran pastor at St Elisabeth's church in Breslau (now Wrocław).

He was active in Silesia. He was an opponent of the Anabaptists, and pressed for their persecution.

He was also a proponent of the education of women.

Notes

1494 births
1554 deaths
Clergy from Wrocław
German Lutheran theologians
German male non-fiction writers